2001–02 Bosnia and Herzegovina Football Cup was the eighth season of the Bosnia and Herzegovina's annual football cup, and a second season of the unified competition. The competition started on 28 November 2001 with the First Round and concluded on 29 May 2002 with the Final.

First round
Thirty-two teams entered in the First Round. The first legs were played on 28 November and the second legs were played on 2 December 2001.

|}

Second round
The 16 winners from the prior round enter this round. The first legs were played on 24 February and the second legs were played on 27 February 2002.
 

|}

Quarterfinals
The eight winners from the prior round enter this round. The first legs were played on 13 March and the second legs were played on 20 March 2002.

|}

Semifinals
The four winners from the prior round enter this round. The first legs will be played on 10 April and the second legs were played on 30 April 2002.

|}

Final

See also
 2001–02 Premier League of Bosnia and Herzegovina

External links
Statistics on RSSSF

Bosnia and Herzegovina Football Cup seasons
Cup
Bosnia